Birger Brandtzæg (29 April 1893 – 16 July 1971) was a Norwegian merchant and owner of a fishing station. He was born in Abelvær. He established the company Brandtzæg Canning in Abelsvær. He was decorated Knight, First Class of the Order of St. Olav in 1952.

References

1893 births
1971 deaths
People from Nærøy
Norwegian merchants